Hugh Howie (14 February 1924 – 14 January 1958) was a Scottish footballer who played for Newton Juniors, Hibernian and the Scotland national team.

Howie, born in Glasgow, was a defender and joined Hibernian from Newton Juniors in 1943 and remained at Easter Road for the remainder of his career. He was part of the Hibs team that won three League Championships in 1947–48, 1950–51 and 1951–52. He scored in his only Scotland cap, a 3–1 win over Wales in October 1948.

He was forced to retire from football in 1954 for medical reasons, having contracted tuberculosis. He became a journalist, but died in a car accident in 1958.

References

External links

1924 births
1958 deaths
Sportspeople from Cambuslang
Road incident deaths in Scotland
Association football defenders
Scottish footballers
Scotland international footballers
Hibernian F.C. players
Scottish Football League players
Footballers from South Lanarkshire